Robert Johnson Tenner (June 1, 1913 – November 16, 1984) was an American football end for the Green Bay Packers of the National Football League (NFL).  Tenner played collegiate ball for the University of Minnesota and played professionally for one season, in 1935.

References

1913 births
1984 deaths
Players of American football from Minneapolis
American football tight ends
Minnesota Golden Gophers football players
Green Bay Packers players